Smedley is an unincorporated community in Vernon Township, Washington County, in the U.S. state of Indiana.

History
Smedley was named for its first postmaster, Morgan Smedley. The post office was established there in 1849, soon after the railroad was built through that territory.

Geography

References

Unincorporated communities in Washington County, Indiana
Unincorporated communities in Indiana